Barbara Anne Mitchell (born June 4, 1956) is an American former competition swimmer.  Mitchell represented the United States as a 16-year-old at the 1972 Summer Olympics in Munich, Germany.  She competed in the preliminary heats of the women's 200-meter breaststroke, recording the thirteenth-best overall time of 2:47.05.

Education
Mitchell attended the University of Hawaii where she competed with the Hawaii Rainbow Wahine swim team. With the Hawaii Rainbow Wahine's, she won the 200 individual medley in 1975 to become the University of Hawaii's first national champion.

See also
 List of University of Hawaii alumni

References

External links
Olympic profile

1956 births
Living people
American female breaststroke swimmers
Hawaii Rainbow Wahine swimmers
Olympic swimmers of the United States
Swimmers from Seattle
Swimmers at the 1972 Summer Olympics